Hamilton South is one of the 20 electoral wards of South Lanarkshire Council. Created in 2007, the ward elects four councillors using the single transferable vote electoral system and covers an area with a population of 18,524 people.

The ward is a Labour stronghold with the party winning half the seats at every election since the ward's creation. Between 2014 and 2017, the party held three of the four seats following a defection.

Boundaries
The ward was created following the Fourth Statutory Reviews of Electoral Arrangements ahead of the 2007 Scottish local elections. As a result of the Local Governance (Scotland) Act 2004, local elections in Scotland would use the single transferable vote electoral system from 2007 onwards so Larkhall was formed from an amalgamation of several previous first-past-the-post wards. It contained all of the former Dalserf, Larkhall East and Larkhall West wards as well as part of the former Cadzow ward and a small part of the former Hamilton Centre/Ferniegair and Stonehouse wards. As the name suggests, Larkhall centres on the town of Larkhall and the surrounding rural area including the villages of Ashgill, Netherburn and Quarter. The ward's eastern boundary is formed by the River Clyde which coincides with the council's border with North Lanarkshire Council. Following the Fifth Statutory Reviews of Electoral Arrangements ahead of the 2017 Scottish local elections, the ward's boundaries were unchanged.

Councillors

Election results

2022 election

2017 election

2012 election

2007 election

Notes

References

Wards of South Lanarkshire
Larkhall